Frances Yung Ming Fong (born 1972 with family roots in Wuxi, Jiangsu) was the director of Group Finance Department of CITIC Pacific. She is the deputy chairman of CITIC Pacific Communications Limited and the director of Hong Kong Eastern Harbour Tunnel Company. She is the daughter of Larry Yung Chi Kin, the former chairman of CITIC Pacific.

2008 CITIC Pacific foreign exchange losses 

In October 2008, Yung and other two senior executives were involved in an unauthorized foreign exchange deals in CITIC Pacific, which caused a HK$15.5 billion loss in the company. Then she was removed from the finance department and demoted with a salary cut, confirmed by Henry Fan, the CITIC Pacific's managing director.

References

1972 births
Living people
Hong Kong businesspeople
CITIC Group people